Frederick Hastings Chapin (5 September 1852 – 25 January 1900) was an American businessman, mountaineer, photographer, amateur archaeologist and author. He is best known for his exploration of mesas and ancient Pueblo ruins found in the Mesa Verde area of Colorado.

Mesa Verde

Chapin visited the Mesa Verde region during the summers of 1889 and 1890, using explorer Richard Wetherill and members of his family as guides. Although active in exploring and photographing the sites, Chapin was not heavily involved in excavating the ruins or collecting artifacts, though he photographed artifacts collected by the Wetherills. Chapin also assessed the climbing possibilities of mesas and peaks in the area. He described the landscape and ruins in an 1890 article and later in The Land of the Cliff-Dwellers, a book published in 1892 by the Appalachian Mountain Club.

Chapin Mesa, which shelters many of the best known cliff dwellings of Mesa Verde, is named for him.

Rocky Mountain National Park
Frederick H. Chapin explored the Rocky Mountain National Park area and published the book, Mountaineering in Colorado: The Peaks about Estes Park in 1889.  Mount Chapin in the Mummy Range is named for Chapin, and his wife named nearby Ypsilon Mountain.

Publications
 . Reprinted by the University of Arizona Press, with notes and foreword by Robert H. Lister, 1988. .
  
 
  Reprinted in 1987, with forward and notes by James H. Pickering, by the University of Nebraska Press, Lincoln.

References

American archaeologists
American photographers
1852 births
1900 deaths
Place of birth missing
Mesa Verde National Park